David Lenz  (January 21, 1851 – May 21, 1886) was a professional baseball player who played catcher in Major League Baseball for the 1872 Brooklyn Eckfords.

References

External links

1851 births
1886 deaths
Brooklyn Eckfords players
Major League Baseball catchers
19th-century baseball players
Major League Baseball players from Germany
19th-century deaths from tuberculosis
Tuberculosis deaths in New York (state)
German emigrants to the United States